Twaker Jatna Nin (Lit: Take Care Of Your Skin) is the 3rd album by Bengali band Chandrabindoo. It was recorded in Calcutta and released by Asha Audio in 1999.

Track listing
 Aj Abar (Lyrics & Music: Subhendu)
 Twaker Jatna Nin (Lyrics & Music: Anindya)
 Riskawala (Lyrics: Chandril / Music: Anindya)
 Ure Jachhe (Lyrics & Music: Anindya)
 Matir Kachhakachhi (Lyrics: Subhendu / Music: Upal)
 Bhut Bosechhe (Lyrics: Chandril / Music: Upal)
 Fer Bhut Bosechhe (Lyrics: Chandril / Music: Upal)
 Adda (Lyrics & Music: Anindya)
 Ekti Murgi (Lyrics & Music: Anindya)
 Bhorer Kuasha (Lyrics: Anindya / Music: Upal)
 Bathroom (Lyrics: Chandril)

This album is lyrically different from its predecessors.
"Riskawala" describes a typical day in the life of a Rickshaw-puller. "Bathroom" is a humorous yet sharp take on the bullying faced by Elementary school students in the name of discipline by their teachers. The two consecutive and closely related tracks "Bhut Bosechhe" and "Fer Bhut Bosechhe" bring back the satire and symbolic Chandrabindoo lyrics. "Ekti Murgi" is a take on the Indian Democracy.

Notes

1999 albums
Chandrabindoo (band) albums